Percy Friebe (born 9 May 1931) is a former Scotland international rugby union player. Friebe played as a No. 8.

Rugby union career

Amateur career

Friebe played for Glasgow HSFP.

He also played for Worcester Warriors, Moseley and the RAF rugby union.

Friebe scored the first ever try at Burnbrae when Glasgow HSFP opened West of Scotland's new ground in 1960.

Provincial career

Friebe played for Glasgow District. He won the 1951-52 Inter-City against Edinburgh District.

He played for Glasgow in the Scottish Inter-District Championship. He played in the 1953–54 Scottish Inter-District Championship and the 1954-55 championship.

He also played for the combined Glasgow-Edinburgh 'Cities' side against South Africa.

International career

He was capped for  once, in 1952, in the Five Nations match against England at Murrayfield.

Administration

Friebe is the Honorary President of Glasgow High Kelvinside.

References

1931 births
2019 deaths
Glasgow District (rugby union) players
Glasgow HSFP players
Moseley Rugby Football Club players
Royal Air Force rugby union players
Rugby union players from Glasgow
Scotland international rugby union players
Scottish rugby union players
Worcester Warriors players
Rugby union number eights